The Coimbra Group (CG) is an international association of 41 universities in Europe. It was established in 1985. It works for the benefit of its members by promoting "internationalization, academic collaboration, excellence in learning and research, and service to society" through "creating special academic and cultural ties", by lobbying at the European level, and by developing best-practice.

History

The Coimbra Group was founded in 1985 and formally constituted in 1987 by a charter signed between its members, then numbering 19. In 1994 it published Charters of Foundation and Early Documents of the Universities of the Coimbra Group. A second edition was published in 2005, by which time Caen had left the group while Bergen, Geneva, Graz, Lyon, Padua, Tartu and Turku had joined.

In 2013 the group consisted of 40 universities, but by the following year this had fallen to 37 with the departures of the Aristotle University of Thessaloniki (Greece), the University of Cambridge (UK) and the University of Oxford (UK). Since then, the Group has added Vilnius University (Lithuania) in June 2015 and Durham University (UK) in June 2016. This brought the membership of the group to 39, but it subsequently fell to 38 in October 2016, when the University of Lyon (France) decided to leave the Group. At the General Assembly in June 2017, the University of Cologne was invited to join as the 39th member, while Utrecht University joined the group in December 2020.

Members
 the Coimbra Group includes 40 universities in 22 countries:

Suspended members
The membership of Saint Petersburg State University (Russia) was suspended on 10 March 2022.

Former members

 University of Caen* (France)
 University of Cambridge (UK)
 University of Lyon (France)
 University of Oxford* (UK)
 Aristotle University of Thessaloniki* (Greece)

(* denotes founding member)

References

External links
Official website

College and university associations and consortia in Europe